Sunny Mabrey (born November 28, 1975) is an American actress and model. Prior to debuting in films, Mabrey appeared in music videos, such as "Nookie" from Limp Bizkit. Her breakthrough came after she played the lead role, man-eating alien Sara, in Species III (2004), supporting antagonist Charlie Mayweather in XXX: State of the Union (2005) and flight attendant Tiffany in Snakes on a Plane (2006).

Life and career
Mabrey is from Gadsden, Alabama. She started her career in front of the cameras as a fashion model at the age of 18. She has performed in commercials for The Gap. She appeared in the music video for the Lonestar song "Amazed". She was creatively active on the six-second video app Vine, on which she had over one million followers.

Mabrey married actor Ethan Embry on July 17, 2005. Mabrey filed for divorce seven years later on July 25, 2012, citing irreconcilable differences. They began dating again in 2013, and remarried in June 2015.  In November 2006, Mabrey and Embry were robbed at gunpoint in their driveway.

Mabrey and Embry have homes in Los Angeles and Atlanta. Mabrey also has a stepson from Embry's previous marriage.

Filmography

Film

Television

Music videos

References

External links
 
 

1975 births
Actresses from Alabama
American film actresses
American television actresses
Living people
People from Gadsden, Alabama
20th-century American actresses
21st-century American actresses